Harriet A. Washington is an American writer and medical ethicist. She is the author of the book Medical Apartheid, which won the 2007 National Book Critics Circle Award for Nonfiction. She has also written books on environmental racism and the erosion of informed consent in medicine.

Washington has been a fellow in ethics at the Harvard Medical School, a fellow at the Harvard School of Public Health, and a senior research scholar at the National Center for Bioethics at Tuskegee University.

Career
Washington was Health and Science editor of the Rochester Democrat and Chronicle. In 1990, she was awarded the New Horizons Traveling Fellowship by the Council for the Advancement of Science Writing. She subsequently worked as a Page One editor at USA Today newspaper, before winning a fellowship from the Harvard School of Public Health. In 1997, she won a John S. Knight Fellowship at Stanford University, and in 2002 was named a research fellow in medical ethics at Harvard Medical School.

In 2007, Washington's third book, Medical Apartheid won the 2007 National Book Critics Circle Award for Nonfiction. The book has been described as "the first and only comprehensive history of medical experimentation on African Americans."

In 2019, she published A Terrible Thing to Waste: Environmental Racism and Its Assault on the American Mind, which explores how poor people of color disproportionately suffer from environmental disasters and exposure to environmental toxins, including lead, arsenic, mercury, and DDT. Exposure to these chemicals impairs brain development and can lead to lower IQ.

Washington was a visiting scholar at the DePaul University College of Law and is now a Bennett Fellow at the Black Mountain Institute of the University of Las Vegas at Nevada.

Washington has been interviewed by NPR and Democracy Now!.

Selected bibliography

Personal life
Washington was born in Fort Dix, New Jersey. She graduated from the University of Rochester in 1976 with a B.A. in English literature and later completed an M.A. in journalism at the Columbia University Graduate School of Journalism.

Washington lives in Manhattan. She was married to Ron DeBose from 1992 until his death in 2013.

References

External links
 
 Harriet A. Washington biography by Penguin Random House
 

1951 births
Living people
American medical writers
Women medical writers
PEN Oakland/Josephine Miles Literary Award winners
20th-century American women writers
21st-century American women writers
Writers from New Jersey
People from Fort Dix
University of Rochester alumni
Writers from Manhattan
20th-century American non-fiction writers
21st-century American non-fiction writers
Columbia University Graduate School of Journalism alumni
Columbia University faculty
American women academics
20th-century African-American women writers
20th-century African-American writers
21st-century African-American women writers
21st-century African-American writers